Vicente Lucio Salazar (20 December 1832 – 14 February 1896) was Acting President of Ecuador between 16 April 1895 and 1 September 1895.

Salazar was Presidents of the Chamber of Deputies in 1873, and President of the Senate in 1892. He became Vice President in 1894, and became president when Luis Cordero left office.

He was Minister of Finance in 1873, 1883, 1884-1887, 1888 and 1893.

References

External links
 Official Website of the Ecuadorian Government about the country President's History

1832 births
1896 deaths
Presidents of Ecuador
Vice presidents of Ecuador
Presidents of the Senate of Ecuador
Presidents of the Chamber of Deputies of Ecuador
Ecuadorian Ministers of Finance